Tala taluka is a taluka in Raigad district of Maharashtra an Indian state.

Raigad district
As of August 2015, there were 8 sub-divisions, 15 talukas, 1970 villages, 60 revenue circles and 350 sazzas in Raigad district. The talukas being Alibag, Karjat, Khalapur, Mahad, Mangaon, Mhasala, Murud, Panvel, Pen, Poladpur, Roha, Shrivardhan, Sudhagad Pali, Tala and Uran.

References

Talukas in Maharashtra
Talukas in Raigad district